Phyllocnistis oxyopa is a moth of the family Gracillariidae, known from Maharashtra, India. It was named by E. Meyrick in 1918.

References

Phyllocnistis
Endemic fauna of India
Moths of Asia